Country Memories is the 33rd studio album by Jerry Lee Lewis, released on Mercury Records in 1977.

Background
By 1977, Lewis's long relationship with Mercury Records and producer Jerry Kennedy was coming to an end.  He had signed with Smash, a division of Mercury, in 1963 and in 1968 began an incredible run on the country charts with 17 Top 10 hits, including four chart toppers, but by the mid-seventies his albums were beginning to sound overproduced and stale as the hits dried up. Years of constant touring, boozing, and pill popping had also caught up to Lewis, who would begin to have ongoing health problems (such as bleeding ulcers and stomach tears) for the first time in 1977.  His voice had also grown noticeably hoarse.  He was still very much in-demand as a performer, making guest appearances on the late-night TV show The Midnight Special and selling out shows, but he would only record one more album for Mercury, 1978's Jerry Lee Keeps Rockin'.

Recording
Lewis's last big hit on Mercury was "Middle Age Crazy", a song written by Sonny Throckmorton about a man who wants to stay young forever, a poignant theme for Lewis. In the liner notes to the 2006 retrospective A Half Century of Hits, Kennedy remembers the session coincided with one of Lewis's first hospitalizations, and that "the Killer" "was as white as a sheet. I was surprised we got anything from him." The track - which features legendary blind session man Hargus "Pig" Robbins on piano, not Lewis - had been pre-recorded by Kennedy in advance, leaving Jerry Lee to overdub his vocal. "That was our last big hit," Lewis recalled to biographer Rick Bragg in 2014. "That's something Jerry Kennedy wanted to prove he could do. The voices and everything, except mine. And I brought it home and played it, and I played it, and I learned it...And I went up there to Nashville, and he set it up and everything, and I walked up to the microphone, took one take on it, and that was it." The single went to number 4 on the Billboard country chart. A second single, the Bobby Braddock ballad "Come On In", also hit the top 10.

Track listing
"Middle Age Crazy" (Sonny Throckmorton)
"Let's Say Goodbye Like We Said Hello (In a Friendly Kind of Way)" (Jimmie Skinner, Ernest Tubb)
"Who's Sorry Now?" (Bert Kalmar, Harry Ruby, Ted Snyder)
"Jealous Heart" (Jenny Carson)
"Georgia On My Mind" (Hoagy Carmichael, Stuart Gorrell)
"Come on In" (Bobby Braddock)
"As Long as We Live" (Bob McDill)
"(You'd Think By Now) I'd Be Over You" (Jerry Foster, Bill Rice)
"Country Memories" (Jerry Foster, Bill Rice)
"What's So Good About Goodbye" (Bob McDill)
"Tennessee Saturday Night" (Billy Hughes)

Jerry Lee Lewis albums
1977 albums
Albums produced by Jerry Kennedy
Mercury Records albums